Trapania japonica is a species of sea slug, a dorid nudibranch, a marine gastropod mollusc in the family Goniodorididae.

Distribution
This species was first described from Japan. It is also known from Hong Kong, the Philippines, Indonesia and Queensland, Australia.

Description
The length of body attains 10 mm. This goniodorid nudibranch is white in colour, with a pattern of large dark brown spots on the body and long yellow lateral papillae. The oral tentacles are entirely dark brown and the rhinophores and gills are tipped with brown pigment.

Ecology
Trapania japonica probably feeds on Entoprocta which often grow on sponges.

References

 Marshall, J.G. & Willan, R.C. 1999. Nudibranchs of Heron Island, Great Barrier Reef. Leiden : Backhuys 257 pp.

Goniodorididae
Gastropods described in 1935